A buoy is a floating device that can have many purposes. It can be anchored (stationary) or allowed to drift with ocean currents.

Types

Navigational buoys
 Race course marker buoys are used for buoy racing, the most prevalent form of yacht racing and power boat racing. They delimit the course and must be passed to a specified side. They are also used in underwater orienteering competitions.
 Emergency wreck buoys provide a clear and unambiguous means of temporarily marking new wrecks, typically for the first 24–72 hours. They are coloured in an equal number of blue and yellow vertical stripes and fitted with an alternating blue and yellow flashing light.
 Ice marking buoys mark holes in frozen lakes and rivers so snowmobiles do not drive over the holes.
 Large Navigational Buoys (LNB, or Lanby buoys) are automatic buoys over 10 m high equipped with a powerful light monitored electronically as a replacement for a lightvessel. They may be marked on charts as a "Superbuoy."
 Lateral marker buoys
 Safe water mark or fairway buoys mark the entrance to a channel or nearby landfall
 Sea marks aid pilotage by marking a maritime channel, hazard or administrative area to allow boats and ships to navigate safely. Some are fitted with wave-activated bells or gongs.
 Wreck buoys mark a wrecked ship to warn other ships to keep away because of unseen hazards.
 Light buoys provide demarcation at night.

Marker buoys 
Buoys are often used to temporarily or permanently mark the positions of underwater objects:
 Lobster trap buoys are brightly colored buoys making lobster trap locations so lobster fishers can find their lobster traps. Each fisher has a unique colour marking or registration number.  They are allowed to haul only their own traps, and must display their buoy colour or license number on their boat so law enforcement officials know what they should be hauling. The buoys are brightly coloured with highly visible numbers so they can be seen in poor visibility conditions like rain, fog and sea smoke.

Diving 
Several types of marker buoys may be used by divers:
 Decompression buoys are deployed by submerged SCUBA divers to mark their position underwater whilst doing decompression stops
 Shot buoys mark dive sites for the boat safety cover of scuba divers so they can descend to dive sites more easily in conditions of low visibility or tidal currents and more safely do decompression stops on their ascents.
 Surface marker buoys are taken on dives by scuba divers to mark their positions underwater.
 Dive site demarcation buoys indicate that divers are working in the marked area, to warn passing vessels to stay clear.

Rescue 
 Lifebuoys are lifesaving buoys thrown to people in the water to provide buoyancy. They usually have a connected line allowing them to be pulled in.
Self-locating datum marker buoys (SLDMB) are 70% scale Coastal Ocean Dynamics Experiment (CODE)/Davis-style oceanographic surface drifters with drogue vanes between 30 and 100 cm deep, designed for deployment from U.S. Coast Guard vessels or airframes for search and rescue. They have very little surface area above water to minimize the effects on them off winds and waves.
 Submarine rescue buoys are released in emergencies and for communication purposes.

Research 
 Profiling buoys are specialized buoys that adjust their buoyancy to sink at a controlled rate to a set depth, for example 2,000 metres while measuring sea temperature and salinity. After a certain period, typically 10 days, they return to the surface, transmit their data via satellite, then sink again. See Argo (oceanography).
 Tsunami buoys are anchored buoys that can detect sudden changes in undersea water pressure, and are a component of tsunami warning systems in the Pacific Tsunami Warning Center and Indian Oceans.
Wave buoys measure the movement of the water surface as a wave train. The data they transmit is analysed to form statistics like significant wave height and period, and wave direction.
 Weather buoys measure weather parameters such as air temperature, barometric pressure, and wind speed and direction. They transmit this data, via satellite radio links such as the purpose-built Argos System or commercial satellite phone networks, to meteorological centres for forecasting and climate study. They may be anchored (moored buoys), or allowed to drift (drifting buoys) in the open currents. Their position is calculated by the satellite. They are also referred to asOcean Data Acquisition Systems, or (ODAS) buoys. and may be marked on charts as "Superbuoys."

Mooring 
 Mooring buoys keep one end of a mooring cable or chain on the water's surface so ships and boats can tie to them. Many marinas mark them with numbers and assign them to particular vessels, or rent them to transient vessels.
 Tripping buoys are used to keep one end of a '' to be used to break out and lift an anchor on the water's surface so that a stuck anchor can more easily be freed.

Military 
 Marker buoys, used in naval warfare (particularly anti-submarine warfare) emit light and/or smoke using pyrotechnic devices to create the flare and smoke. Commonly 3 inches (76 mm) in diameter and about 20 inches (500 mm) long, they are activated by contact with seawater and float on the surface. Some extinguish themselves after a specific period, while others are sunk when they are no longer needed.
 Sonobuoys are used by anti-submarine warfare aircraft to detect submarines by SONAR
Target buoys simulate targets, such as small boats, in live-fire exercises by naval and coastal forces. They are usually targeted by medium-sized weapons such as heavy machine guns, rapid fire cannons (~20 mm), autocannons (up to 40–57mm) and anti-tank rockets.

Specific forms
 DAN buoys are used as:
 Large maritime navigational aids providing a platform for light and radio beacons
 Lifebuoys with flags, used on yachts and smaller pleasure craft
 Temporary markers in Danish seine fishing to mark net anchor positions
 Temporary markers set by danlayers during minesweeping operations to indicate the boundaries of swept paths, swept areas, known hazards, and other locations or reference points
 Temporary markers for rescue operations 
 Spar buoys are tall, thin buoys that float upright, e.g. R/P FLIP

Other

Space buoys, a common element in science fiction, are stationary objects in outer space that provide navigation data or warnings.
“Mail buoys” are imaginary buoys used as a prank in the US Navy; a new sailor may be given the task of locating one to retrieve non-existent mail. Letter boxes on buoys exist in Töre (Sweden) and at the Steinernes Meer

Other uses

The word "buoyed" can also be used figuratively. For example, a person can buoy up ('lift up') someone's spirits by providing help and empathy.
Buoys are used in some wave power systems to generate electrical power.
George A. Stephen, founder of Weber-Stephen Products Co., invented the kettle grill by cutting a metal buoy in half and fashioning a dome shaped grill to it with a rounded lid.

Gallery

See also

References

External links

Global Buoy Network Maps
Lighthouses and Buoys 
North American Buoy Map

Nautical terminology
Navigation
 
Maritime safety